Tang Xuezhong (汤学忠, born 31 March 1969) is a Chinese former cyclist. He competed at the 1988 Summer Olympics and the 1992 Summer Olympics.

References

External links
 

1969 births
Living people
Chinese male cyclists
Olympic cyclists of China
Cyclists at the 1988 Summer Olympics
Cyclists at the 1992 Summer Olympics
Asian Games medalists in cycling
Asian Games gold medalists for China
Asian Games silver medalists for China
Cyclists at the 1990 Asian Games
Cyclists at the 1994 Asian Games
Cyclists at the 1998 Asian Games
Place of birth missing (living people)
Medalists at the 1990 Asian Games
Medalists at the 1994 Asian Games
20th-century Chinese people
21st-century Chinese people